Jay Shields (born 6 January 1985, in Edinburgh) is a Scottish association football player, currently playing with junior side Bo'ness United.

Shields has played for Hibernian, Greenock Morton, Cowdenbeath and Arbroath, with loan spells at Berwick Rangers and Dundee.

Career

A tough battler and a competent defender, Shields made his Hibernian début in 2004. He was loaned out to Berwick Rangers in the first half of the 2005–06 season for first-team experience. After returning to a Hibs squad ravaged with injuries later in the 2005–06 season, Shields made seven starts in the right back position. He was then given a new one-year deal at Hibs. With other players returning to fitness, however, he struggled to gain a place in the Hibs team during the 2006–07 season. He was loaned to Dundee in December 2006, and was released by Hibs at the end of the season.

Shields joined Greenock Morton in August 2007. He then joined Cowdenbeath in January 2008, on a free transfer.

In February 2010, Shields re-joined Berwick Rangers after being released by Cowdenbeath.

In July 2010, Shields signed for Arbroath. He was released at the end of that season, in May 2011.

In September 2011, Shields signed for Bo'ness United.

References

External links

Living people
Footballers from Edinburgh
1985 births
Scottish footballers
Hibernian F.C. players
Berwick Rangers F.C. players
Dundee F.C. players
Greenock Morton F.C. players
Cowdenbeath F.C. players
Scottish Premier League players
Arbroath F.C. players
Scottish Football League players
Association football midfielders
Scottish Junior Football Association players
Bo'ness United F.C. players